Mallow railway station is an Irish station on the Dublin-Cork railway line, Mallow-Tralee railway line and Cork Suburban Rail (Cork Kent, Cobh and Midleton).

Facilities

Mallow's main station building is located on the south side of the railway tracks, nearest to the town, and is constructed from the grey stone typical of many Irish stations. It houses the booking office, administration accommodation and other facilities. There is a covered footbridge at the south-west end which enables passengers to reach the two other platforms, which are all through platforms. It is the transfer station for passengers changing onto the Mallow–Tralee line. The station was acclaimed as Iarnród Éireann's best overall station in 2004.

Location
The station is located in Annabella, just outside Mallow, in north County Cork. It is situated just north of the junction between the lines from Cork and Tralee. It is two miles from Cork Racecourse.

History

The station opened on 17 March 1849.
It was built and operated by the Great Southern and Western Railway. Until March 1967 Mallow was also the Junction of a line which ran to Waterford via Fermoy, Lismore and Dungarvan.

Connections
Passengers can travel from Mallow to Limerick Junction to reach Limerick, Ennis, Athenry, Oranmore and Galway along the Western Rail Corridor. There are also trains from Limerick Junction via Clonmel to Waterford.

Rail Air Links
Passengers can travel direct to Farranfore for Kerry Airport.  Passengers can travel via Limerick Junction and Limerick for a bus connection to Shannon Airport.

References

External links

Irish Rail Mallow Station Website 

Iarnród Éireann stations in County Cork
Railway stations in County Cork
Railway stations opened in 1849
Mallow, County Cork
1849 establishments in Ireland
Railway stations in the Republic of Ireland opened in 1849